The 2009 New Zealand Music Awards was the 44th holding of the annual ceremony featuring awards for musical artists based in or originating from New Zealand. Finalists for the three technical awards were announced on 6 August 2009, with winners announced on 2 September at the Langham Hotel. Finalists for 14 'non-technical' categories were also revealed the same night. Five 'non-technical' awards were presented without a group of finalists being selected. The awards ceremony took place on 8 October 2009 at Vector Arena, Auckland. Broadcast live on television by C4, the ceremony was hosted by comedian Dai Henwood.

Ladyhawke won six awards, including Album and Single of the Year. This was the most awards won at a ceremony since 2004, when Scribe also won six. The People's Choice Award was won by Smashproof, who also claimed the award for the highest selling New Zealand Single. Fat Freddy's Drop were nominated in seven categories, including all three technical categories, and gained the Best Aotearoa Roots Album award. Midnight Youth were finalists in seven categories, and secured awards for Best Group, Best Rock Album and Best Engineer. The highest selling New Zealand Album was The Best: '98-'08, a greatest hits album by rock group The Feelers, while Tiki Taane's "Always on My Mind" achieved the Radio Airplay Record of the Year award. Ray Columbus & the Invaders were awarded the Legacy Award at the announcement of technical award winners, and were inducted into the New Zealand Music Hall of Fame.

Nominees and winners 
Winners are listed first and highlighted in boldface.
Key
 – Non-technical award
 – Technical award

{| class=wikitable style="width:150%"
|-
! style="background:#FFFF99;" ! style="width="50%" | Album of the Year
! style="background:#FFFF99;" ! style="width="50%" | Single of the Year
|-
| valign="top" |
 Ladyhawke – Ladyhawke
 The Mint Chicks – Screens
 Midnight Youth – The Brave Don't Run
 Cut Off Your Hands – You and I
 Fat Freddy's Drop – Dr Boondigga and the Big BW
| valign="top" |
 Ladyhawke – My Delirium"
 Midnight Youth – "All on Our Own"
 P-Money featuring Vince Harder – "Everything"
 Smashproof featuring Gin Wigmore – "Brother"
 Kids of 88 – "My House"
|-
!style="background:#FFFF99;" ! style="width="50%" | Best Group†
!style="background:#FFFF99;" ! style="width="50%" | Breakthrough Artist of the Year†
|-
| valign="top" |
 Midnight Youth
 Fat Freddy's Drop
 The Mint Chicks
| valign="top" |
 Ladyhawke
 Midnight Youth
 Smashproof
|-
!style="background:#FFFF99;" ! style="width="50%" | Best Male Solo Artist†
!style="background:#FFFF99;" ! style="width="50%" | Best Female Solo Artist†
|-
| valign="top" |Sponsor
 Savage
 Dave Dobbyn
 Don McGlashan and The Seven Sisters
| valign="top" |
 Ladyhawke
 Boh Runga
 Ladi 6
|-
!style="background:#FFFF99;" ! style="width="50%" | Peoples' Choice Award†
!style="background:#FFFF99;" ! style="width="50%" | Best Rock Album†
|-
| valign="top" |
 Smashproof
 Fat Freddy's Drop
 Ladyhawke
 Midnight Youth
 The Black Seeds
| valign="top" |
 Midnight Youth – The Brave Don't Run
 The Mint Chicks – Screens
 Cut Off Your Hands – You and I
|-
!style="background:#FFFF99;" ! style="width="50%" | Best Urban / Hip Hop Album†
!style="background:#FFFF99;" ! style="width="50%" | Best Aotearoa Roots Album†
|-
| valign="top" |
 Ladi 6 – Time Is Not Much
 Smashproof – The Weekend
 Savage – Savage Island
| valign="top" |
 Fat Freddy's Drop – Dr Boondigga and the Big BW
 The Black Seeds – Solid Ground
 The Woolshed Sessions – The Woolshed Sessions
|-
!style="background:#FFFF99;" ! style="width="50%" | Best Music Video†
!style="background:#FFFF99;" ! style="width="50%" | Best Dance/Electronica Album†
|-
| valign="top" |
 Chris Graham – "Brother" (Smashproof)
 Sam Peacocke – "I Can't Stop Being Foolish" (The Mint Chicks)
 Tim van Dammen – "Turn Around" (Sola Rosa featuring Lamkum)
| valign="top" |Sponsor
 Ladyhawke – Ladyhawke
 Antiform – City in Exile
 Sola Rosa – Get It Together
|-
!style="background:#FFFF99;" ! style="width="50%" | Best Gospel / Christian Album†
!style="background:#FFFF99;" ! style="width="50%" | Best Classical Album†
|-
| valign="top" |
 Mumsdollar – Ruins
 Parachute Band – Technicolour
 The Ember Days – EP
 Primalband – Your Way| valign="top" |
 David Bremner – Gung Ho
 Gareth Farr – Gareth Farr: Tangaroa New Zealand Chamber Soloists – Ahi|-
!style="background:#FFFF99;" ! style="width="50%" | Highest selling New Zealand Single†
!style="background:#FFFF99;" ! style="width="50%" | Highest selling New Zealand Album†
|-
| valign="top" |
 Smashproof featuring Gin Wigmore – "Brother"
At the time of the awards, "Brother" had been certified double platinum, equal to over 30,000 sales.
| valign="top" |
 The Feelers – The Best: '98-'08
At the time of the awards, The Best: '98–'08 had been certified double platinum, equal to over 30,000 shipments.
|-
!style="background:#FFFF99;" ! style="width="50%" | Radio Airplay Record of the Year†
!style="background:#FFFF99;" ! style="width="50%" | International Achievement Award†
|-
| valign="top" |
 Tiki Taane – "Always on My Mind"
| valign="top" |
 Ladyhawke and Brooke Fraser
|-
!style="background:#FFFF99;" ! style="width="50%" | Legacy Award†
!style="background:lightblue;" ! style="width="50%" | Best Album Cover‡
|-
| valign="top" |
 Ray Columbus & the Invaders
|
 Ruban Nielson – Screens (The Mint Chicks)
 Otis Frizzell – Dr Boondigga and the Big BW (Fat Freddy's Drop)
 Sam Young – The Brave Don't Run (Midnight Youth)
|-
!style="background:lightblue;" ! style="width="50%" | Best Engineer‡
!style="background:lightblue;" ! style="width="50%" | Best Producer‡
|-
| valign="top" |
 Andrew Buckton – The Brave Don't Run (Midnight Youth)
 Chris Faiumu – Dr Boondigga and the Big BW (Fat Freddy's Drop)
 Lee Prebble – When the Fever Takes Hold (Spartacus R)
| valign="top" |
 Andrew Spraggon – Get it Together (Sola Rosa)
 Don McGlashan and Sean Donnelly – Marvellous Year (Don McGlashan and The Seven Sisters)
 Fat Freddy's Drop – Dr Boondigga and the Big BW (Fat Freddy's Drop)
|}

 Performers 
Performers at the ceremony:
 Ladyhawke gave her number "My Delirium".
 Smashproof and Gin Wigmore sang their top selling single "Brother".
 Midnight Youth performed their tune "All on Our Own".
 "Turn Around" was sung by Sola Rosa and Iva Lamkum.
 The Mint Chicks performed a cover of "She's a Mod", originally by Ray Columbus & the Invaders, who received the Legacy Award.
 John Rowles sang "How Great Thou Art" as a tribute to the late Sir Howard Morrison.

 References 

 External links 
 New Zealand Music Awards
 NZ Music Awards 2009 – Photographs by Sunday News''
 Photographs of the ceremony by C4

New Zealand Music Awards
Music Awards
Aotearoa Music Awards
October 2009 events in New Zealand